Mugiyada Kathe (An Unfinished Story) is a 1976 Indian Kannada-language film, directed by Durai and produced by P. H. Rama Rao and R. Pandari Bai. The film stars Rajesh, Sumithra, Pandari Bai and Dinesh. The film has musical score by Rajan–Nagendra.

Cast 

Rajesh
Sumithra
Pandari Bai
Dinesh
M. S. Sathya
Bhaskar
Sundar Krishna Urs
K. Deepak
Mynavathi
Ramadevi
R. T. Rama
Padmanjali
Premakumari
Indira Arasu
K. S. Ashwath in Guest Appearance
T. N. Balakrishna in Guest Appearance
Gangadhar in Guest Appearance
Advani Lakshmi Devi in Guest Appearance
Shailashree in Guest Appearance
Radhika

Soundtrack 
The music was composed by Rajan–Nagendra.

References

External links 
 

1976 films
1970s Kannada-language films
Films scored by Rajan–Nagendra